Collins Township was a township in Allegheny County, Pennsylvania, in the northeast part of what is now Pittsburgh. It included most of the present city east of Lawrenceville, north of Penn Avenue, and south of the Allegheny River. It was formed in 1850 from a northern portion of Peebles Township and was named for Thomas Collins, a prominent lawyer. On 30 June 1868, Collins Township along with the borough of Lawrenceville and the townships of Pitt, Oakland, Liberty, and Peebles were incorporated into Pittsburgh. The former Collins Township became wards 18, 19, and 21 of the expanded city.

References

External links
1862 map of Allegheny County
1862 map of Allegheny County showing a different southern border for Collins Township.
1851 map of Allegheny County incorrectly including the then-borough of Lawrenceville within Collins Township.
1876 map of Pittsburgh with the former Collins Township as Wards 18, 19 and 21.

Former townships in Allegheny County, Pennsylvania
1850 establishments in Pennsylvania